Ripponlea railway station is located on the Sandringham line in Victoria, Australia. It serves the south-eastern Melbourne suburb of Ripponlea, and opened on 1 May 1912.

The station is located at the up (northern) end of the Glen Eira Road level crossing, with station access from Glen Eira Road, Oak Grove and Morres Street.

History
Opening on 1 May 1912, Ripponlea station, like the suburb itself, was named after the Rippon Lea Estate, which was formed by Frederick Thomas Sargood, businessman and a member of Parliament for the Victorian Legislative Council between 1874-1880 and 1882-1901, and a Senator for Victoria between 1901-1903.

In 1960, boom barriers replaced interlocked gates at the Glen Eira Road level crossing, with the signal box protecting the level crossing also abolished during that time.

Platforms and services
Ripponlea has two side platforms. Platform 1 has a large weatherboard building, with a smaller weatherboard building on Platform 2. There is a footbridge immediately south of the station buildings, which connects the two platforms, and allows pedestrians to cross the railway tracks.

It is served by Sandringham line trains.

Platform 1:
  all stations services to Flinders Street

Platform 2:
  all stations services to Sandringham

Transport links
CDC Melbourne operates one route via Ripponlea station, under contract to Public Transport Victoria:
 : Glen Waverley station – St Kilda

Yarra Trams operates one route via Ripponlea station:
 : Melbourne University – Carnegie

Gallery

References

External links
 Melway map at street-directory.com.au

Railway stations in Melbourne
Railway stations in Australia opened in 1912
Railway stations in the City of Port Phillip